Akari may refer to:

 Akari (album), by New York Unit, 1994
 Akari (given name), a feminine Japanese given name
 Akari (puzzle), logic puzzle, also known as Light Up
 Akari (satellite), an infrared astronomy satellite developed by JAXA, in cooperation with institutes of Europe and Korea
 AKARI Project, in telecommunications, refers to the AKARI Architecture Design Project of Japan

See also 
 Akare, a village in the Doufelgou Prefecture in the Kara Region of north-eastern Togo.